China's signature international program is the Belt and Road Initiative (BRI).  215 cooperation documents have been signed with 149 countries and 32 international organisations. The BRI, which launched in September 2013, is General Secretary of the Chinese Communist Party and Chinese President Xi Jinping's "grand political-economic project". It affects three-quarters of the known energy reserves in the world.

Africa
As of August 2022, China's official Belt and Road website lists 52 African countries who have signed onto an agreement or understanding with the One Belt One Road initiative. Africa is considered a key part of China's One Belt One Road efforts, due to its potential for rails, roads, and energy. Many African countries are also in need of better infrastructure, which is still seen as a major barrier to development in the region. In 2020, only 43 percent of Africans had access to electricity, 48 percent had access to paved roads, and 6 percent of agricultural land was irrigated. China began many of its investment activities in the East Africa region, given its access to ports and need for rails and roads, but initiatives have since branched out to numerous projects across the continent. Major road infrastructure projects stretch to south and north Africa, such as Mozambique's Maputo–Katembe bridge and Algeria's Cherchell Ring Expressway Project. Belt and Road projects in Africa focus generally on transport and power but include variation within, from international rail and expressways, seaports, hydropower to carbon-based power, water supply and sanitation, and many other programs.

Subsequently, China's investments in the region have also risen significantly since the beginning of 2000, with total spending from the Chinese government and companies reaching US$23 billion in 2020. China is now the largest funder of infrastructure projects in Africa, financially backing around a fifth of all projects and constructing a third of them. A McKinsey & Company report estimates that more than 10,000 Chinese-owned firms operate in Africa, with about 90 percent privately owned. Numerous studies have shown that Chinese investment has had a positive effect on Africa, though growing debt has led to some states slightly pulling back on their plans. According to the Johns Hopkins China Africa Research Initiative, East African countries alone have borrowed more than $29 billion from China for various projects. Some countries like Djibouti, Kenya, and Uganda have issued warnings over the ballooning debt, following the case of the Magampura Mahinda Rajapaksa Port transfer in Sri Lanka.

To build many of the construction projects, China has sent a large number of Chinese workers to developing countries. However, this has become a point of controversy especially in Africa, as high unemployment rates continue to hurt the large young population. Aside from economic activities, China has also shaped the Belt and Road as an opportunity to build cultural ties between Africa and China.

Algeria
China is now developing Algeria’s El Hamdania Central Port, Algeria’s largest and first deep-water port and the second deep-water port in Africa. China also helped complete the 750-mile East-West Highway that connects Algeria with neighboring Morocco and Tunisia, and about 1,000 Chinese companies operate in Algeria, their way eased by the wavier of the “51/49” requirement.

Djibouti
In total, the Export-Import Bank of China has lent approximately US$1 billion to Djibouti, funding nearly 40 percent of Djibouti's substantial infrastructure and investment projects.

Due to the Belt and Road initiative, Ethiopia and Djibouti are now bridged through the Addis Ababa–Djibouti Railway and Ethiopia-Djibouti Water Pipeline.

China's economic relations with Djibouti have extended to increased military involvement in the Horn of Africa region. Among the numerous Djibouti infrastructure projects, China built a military base and has deployed ships from its South Sea Fleet. Djibouti's base is a sign of China's growing naval presence across the globe. Meanwhile, China has argued that its anti-piracy missions from the Djibouti base has increased its capacity to support One Belt One Road projects.

Egypt
Egypt has traditionally had a very strong relationship with China, so when China first announced its Belt and Road Initiative, Egypt was one of the first countries to sign onto the agreement. Following the instability from the 2011 Arab Spring protests, China was one of few countries willing to provide loans and financial support to Egypt. Since, China has introduced a number of projects including a Chinese industrial zone in the Gulf of Suez, an electric train system for its new capital, and investments in the Western Sahara. Egypt's New Administrative Capital is also a landmark for the Belt and Road Initiative. From 2015 to 2017, Egypt borrowed US$1.03 billion from China to finance various infrastructure projects. The same time period brought in around 1,900 workers from China to work on construction. 
The scale of China's projects and consistent Belt and Road activity has also strengthened diplomatic ties between Egypt and China. Chinese President and CCP General Secretary Xi Jinping and President Abdel Fatah al-Sisi have praised one another repeatedly for their efforts in the One Belt One Road initiative, and emphasized their shared history of ancient civilizations and infrastructure. Egypt is seen as a vital part of China's One Belt One Road initiative, due to its geographical position and close diplomatic relationship. In 2018, a Chinese consortium that included Shanghai Electric and Dongfang Electric won a tender for a 6,000 megawatt coal-fired electricity-generating plant in Hamrawein, on the Red Sea, with a bid of $4.4 billion. In February 2020, as a result of the COVID-19 pandemic, Egypt postponed indefinitely China-funded construction of the power plant at Hamrawein.

Ethiopia
Ethiopia's Eastern Industrial Zone, in the town of Dukem, is a manufacturing hub outside Addis Ababa that was built by China through the China-Africa Development Fund and occupied by factories of Chinese manufacturers. According to Chinese media and the vice director of the industrial zone, there were 83 companies resident within the zone, of which 56 had started production. However, a study in Geoforum noted that the EIZ has yet to serve as a catalyst for Ethiopia's overall economic development due to many factors including poor infrastructure outside the zone. Discrepancies between the two countries' industries also mean that Ethiopia cannot benefit from direct technological transfer and innovation.

From October 2011 to February 2012, Chinese companies were contracted to supersede the century-old Ethio-Djibouti Railways by constructing a new electric standard gauge Addis Ababa–Djibouti Railway. The first freight service began in November 2015 and passenger service followed in October 2016. On China–Ethiopia cooperation on international affairs, China's Foreign Minister Wang Yi said that China and Ethiopia are both developing countries, and both countries are faced with a complicated international environment. He stated that the partnership will be a model at the forefront of developing China–Africa relations.

Kenya
In May 2014, Premier Li Keqiang signed a cooperation agreement with the Kenyan government to build the Mombasa–Nairobi Standard Gauge Railway connecting Mombasa to Nairobi. The railway cost US$3.2bn and was Kenya's biggest infrastructure project since independence. The railway was claimed to cut the journey time from Mombasa to Nairobi from 9 hours by bus or 12 hours on the previous railway to 4.5 hours. In May 2017, Kenyan President Uhuru Kenyatta called the 470 km railway a new chapter that "would begin to reshape the story of Kenya for the next 100 years". The project is seen as President Kenyatta's legacy project According to Kenya Railways Corporation, the railway carried 1.3 million Kenyans with a 96.7% seat occupancy and 600,000 tons of cargo in its first year of operation. Chinese media claim that the railway line boosted the country's GDP by 1.5% and created 46,000 jobs for locals and trained 1,600 railway professionals. However, in 2019, China suddenly stopped funding of its railway, about 75 miles short of Nairobi. Cease in funding came rather surprisingly, but may be attributed to rising concerns globally that "Belt and Road was loading poorer nations with unsustainable debt. Xi signaled in April that Beijing would exert more control over projects and tighten oversight."

Nigeria 
The Abuja-Kaduna railway line began commercial operation on 27 July 2016 after being constructed by China Civil Engineering Construction Company (CCECC). It is one of the first standard gauge railroad railway modernization projects (SGRMP) in Nigeria. This is the first part of the Lagos-Kano standard metrics project, which will connect the business centres of Nigeria with the economic activity centres of the northwestern part of the country.

In a resolution of the Johannesburg Summit of the China-Africa Cooperation Forum in 2015, the Chinese government promised to provide satellite television to 10,000 African villages. It is reported that each of the 1,000 selected villages in Nigeria, the most populous country in Africa, will receive two sets of solar projection television systems and a set of solar 32-inch digital TV integrated terminal systems. A total of 20,000 Nigerian rural families will benefit from the project. Kpaduma, an underdeveloped rural community on the edge of the Nigerian capital of Abuja, is familiar with analog TV and has no chance to see the satellite TV channels enjoyed by people in Nigerian towns. The implementation of the project will create more jobs, 1,000 Nigerians in selected villages have received training on how to install, recharge and operate satellite TV systems.

Sudan
In Sudan, China has helped the country establish its oil industry and provided agricultural assistance for the cotton industry.

Future plans include developing railways, roads, ports, a nuclear power station, solar power farms and more dams for irrigation and electricity generation.

The railways have been rehabilitated. The Sudan Railways Authority is receiving 21 new locomotives from the Chinese company CRRC Ziyang, which departed from the Chinese port in mid-June 2022 and is expected to arrive in Port Sudan in the first week of August. Out of the 34 locomotives agreed on in a contract signed between the Sudan Railways Authority and CRRC Ziyang in September 2020, these 21 new locomotives would be the first batch received. As an important achievement of the authority, this project has received great attention from the governments of Sudan and China. With the arrival of new locomotives, the rail transport capacity is expected to significantly improve, becoming a great contributor to raising the country's economy.

Tanzania

Tanzania on Dec 20, 2022 signed a $2.2-billion contract with a Chinese company to build the final section of a railway line aimed at linking the country's main port with its neighbours.

The 2,561-kilometre (1,600-mile) line will link the Indian Ocean port of Dar es Salaam to Mwanza on Lake Victoria, with eventual spurs to Burundi, Democratic Republic of Congo (DRC), Rwanda and Uganda.

Uganda
In Uganda, Chinese companies have financed two major hydroelectricity projects, the Karuma Hydropower Project and Isimba Hydroelectric Power Station. The Export-Import Bank of China granted loans that covered approximately 85% of funding for both projects, while the government of Uganda provided the remaining 15 percent. Uganda also borrowed $350 million to build the Entebbe–Kampala Expressway, the terms of which include 20 years with a 7 years grace period and 2% fixed interest rate. More recently in 2020, Uganda announced it would be borrowing another US$118 million for roads, part of an oil production project that Uganda has looked to kickoff for the past few years. 
Diplomatically, President Museveni has praised China for its willingness to fund projects with "no strings attached", allowing Museveni to take on a number of projects for the first time in his three-decade term. China's Ambassador Zheng Zhuqian also reaffirmed the relationship with Uganda, remarking that China "firmly supports the Ugandan exploration for a development path with Ugandan characteristics." However, critics warn over Uganda's burgeoning debt, which was at $10 billion in 2018 and a third of which is owed to China.

Europe
Freight train services between China and Europe were initiated in March 2011. The service's first freight route linked China to Tehran. The China–Britain route was launched in January 2017. , the network had expanded to cover 48 Chinese cities and 42 European destinations, delivering goods between China and Europe. The 10,000th trip was completed on 26 August 2018 with the arrival of freight train X8044 in Wuhan, China from Hamburg, Germany. The network was further extended southward to Vietnam in March 2018.

Poland 

Poland was one of the first European countries to sign a Memorandum of Understanding with China about the BRI in 2015. Poland's President Duda said that he hopes Poland will become a gateway to Europe for China.

Greece
The foreign ministers of China and Greece signed a memorandum of understanding related to further cooperation under the Belt and Road initiative on 29 August 2018. COSCO revitalized and currently runs the Port of Piraeus. Both China and Greece see each other as natural allies in developing the Belt & Road", Xi Jinping said at the start of a state visit aimed at deepening cooperation with Greece across the board, adding his desire to "keep the momentum going" and "reinforce" bilateral relations

Portugal 
During Xi's visit to Lisbon in December 2018, the Southern European nation signed a Memorandum of Understanding with China.

Italy
In March 2019, Italy became the first G7 Nation to sign a non-binding memorandum of understanding relating to China's Belt and Road Initiative.

Austria 
During a visit of Chancellor Kurz to China in April 2019, a Memorandum of Understanding was signed on Austria's cooperation in the BRI project. According to Kurz, Austria "support[s] the One Belt One Road initiative and [is] trying to forge a close economic cooperation [with China]. Austria has know-how and expertise to offer in many areas where China is looking for the same".

Luxembourg
On 27 March 2019, Luxembourg signed an agreement with China to cooperate on Belt and Road Initiative.

Switzerland
On 29 April 2019, during his visit to Beijing, Swiss President Ueli Maurer signed a Memorandum of Understanding with China under the Belt and Road Initiative.

Caucasus

Armenia
On 4 April 2019, the President of Armenia Armen Sarkissian received a delegation led by Shen Yueyue, Vice- of the National People's Congress Standing Committee of China in Yerevan, Armenia. President Sarkissian stated that Armenia and China are ancient countries with centuries-old tradition of cooperation since the existence of the Silk Road. The President noted the development of cooperation in the 21st century in the sidelines of the One Belt One Road program initiated by the top leadership of China and stated that "It's time for Armenia to become part of the new Silk Road".

Azerbaijan
On 25–27 April 2019, the Second Belt and Road Forum for International Cooperation was held in Beijing, China. A delegation led by President of the Republic of Azerbaijan Ilham Aliyev attended the Forum. The event brought together heads of governments from 37 countries, including Azerbaijan, Russia, Pakistan, Kazakhstan, Austria, Belarus, the Czech Republic, Greece, Hungary, Italy, Serbia, Singapore, the UAE, and others, as well as heads of international organizations. In his speech, the President Ilham Aliyev stated that, "From the very beginning Azerbaijan supported the Belt and Road initiative put forward by [Xi]. This initiative not only provides transportation of productivity, it strengthens ties between different countries, serve the course of dialogue and cooperation, creates new opportunities for international trade."

The creation of modern infrastructure is one of the priorities for Azerbaijan and will foster the flow of international trade by building bridges between Europe and Asia. Among these notable infrastructure projects are Baku-Tbilisi-Kars railway and the Baku International Sea Trade Port (the Port of Baku) that play an important role in transportation in Eurasia. Currently, the Port of Baku has the capacity to handle 15 million tons of cargo, including 100000 TEU, which will grow to 25 million tons of cargo and 500000 TEU in the future. By investing in modern transportation and logistics infrastructure Azerbaijan not only transforms itself into an important transportation hub but also contributes to the cooperation with countries involved in east–west and North-South Corridors.

Georgia
On 25 April 2019, the Minister of Infrastructure and Regional Development of Georgia Maya Tskitishvili stated that, "One Belt-One Road initiative is important for Georgia and the country is actively involved in its development." She also noted that Georgia was among the first countries who signed the memorandum for developing the 'One Belt-One Road' initiative in March 2015.

Russia and the Eurasian Economic Union

On 26 April 2019, the leaders of Russia and China called their countries "good friends" and vowed to work together in pursuing greater economic integration of Eurasia. On the sidelines of the Belt and Road Forum in Beijing, Xi and Russian president Vladimir Putin pledged to further strengthen economic and trade cooperation between the two sides. Vladimir Putin further stated that, "countries gathering under the Belt and Road Initiative and the Eurasian Economic Union share long-term strategic interests of peace and growth".

In June 2019, Xi and Putin stated they were committed to the concept of building the "Great Eurasian Partnership". That took the form of Xi stating that he had agreed with Putin to link the Eurasian Economic Union with China's Belt & Road Initiative.

The China–Belarus Industrial Park is a  special economic zone established in Smolevichy, Minsk in 2013. According to the park's chief administrator, 36 international companies have settled in the park as of August 2018. Chinese media said the park will create 6,000 jobs and become a real city with 10,000 residents by 2020.

Asia

Central Asia 
The five countries of Central Asia – Kazakhstan, Kyrgyzstan, Tajikistan, Turkmenistan, and Uzbekistan – are an important part of the land route of the Belt and Road Initiative (BRI). The Central Asia Data-Gathering and Analysis Team has identified 261 BRI projects within Central Asian nations with a minimum investment totaling more than US$136 million.

As of April 2019, Kazakhstan invested about $30 billion on infrastructure development, transport and logistics assets and competence as part of the Belt and Road Initiative. Due to Kazakhstan's infrastructure modernization, The Western Europe – Western China intercontinental highway now connects Europe and China through Russia and Kazakhstan. Kazakhstan stands to receive a potential $5 billion annually in transit fees from goods moving through it to other markets.

In Kyrgyzstan, 2011–2017 BRI projects total committed funds is equal to US$4.1 billion. Employment created from established companies is not significant, making up only 0.1–0.3% of total employment in the country, just several thousand jobs. The weight of debt repayment for BRI projects will not be felt until the 2020s, because of the grace periods on most loans ranging from 5–11 years. Kyrgyzstan has the potential to benefit greatly from BRI; If tax legislation is handled well, particularly in manufacturing and transit projects, then revenue will be high.

“From the perspective of Uzbekistan, the BRI could help open the corridor to the Persian Gulf, enabling expansion of commercial and trade routes for the country." Exporting Uzbek goods to more regions is a highly attractive incentive for Uzbekistan. At the First Belt and Road Forum held in Beijing May 2017 both presidents, Mirziyoyev of Uzbekistan and Xi, spoke positively of future collaboration in BRI advancement. During those meetings, the "two countries signed 115 deals worth more $23 billion on enhancing their cooperation in electrical power, oil production, chemicals, architecture, textiles, pharmaceutical engineering, transportation, infrastructure and agriculture." In 2019 Uzbekistan established a new government group in charge of aligning their own country's development plan with China's BRI ambitions. China is Uzbekistan's largest trade partner (both in imports and exports) and has more than 1500 Chinese businesses within its territory. In 2018, "China-Uzbekistan trade surged 48.4 percent year-on-year, reaching 6.26 billion U.S. dollars."

“BRI projects in Tajikistan range from roads and railways to pipelines and power plants, even including traffic cameras." In 2018, "Tajikistan paid a Chinese company building a power plant with a gold mine; a few years earlier it swapped Beijing some land for debt."

Turkmenistan in most regards has been closed off to the world. However, Turkmenistan, because of a desire to see infrastructure and energy projects move ahead, is increasingly opening itself to the world. Turkmenistan doesn't have the capabilities of seeing many of its projects come to fruition on its own. In June 2016, Gurbanguly, Turkmenistan's president, approached Xi to discuss his desire to become more involved in BRI and seeing previously planned projects completed and or expanded. These projects include the Turkmenistan's and China gas pipeline (with four lines, the fourth forthcoming), The International North-South transportation corridor (which provides railway connections between Russia, Kazakhstan, Turkmenistan and Iran, with another line connecting China to Iran via Kazakhstan and Turkmenistan), The Lapis Lazuli international transit corridor (rail connecting Afghanistan, Turkmenistan, Azerbaijan, Georgia and Turkey), and the Turkmenistan-Afghanistan- Pakistan-India (TAPI) pipeline project.

The Five Nations Railway Corridor between China and Iran through Afghanistan, Tajikistan, Kyrgyzstan has been proposed since 2014.

Hong Kong
During his 2016 policy address, Hong Kong chief executive Leung Chun-ying's announced his intention of setting up a Maritime Authority aimed at strengthening Hong Kong's maritime logistics in line with Beijing's economic policy. Leung mentioned "One Belt, One Road" no fewer than 48 times during the policy address, but details were scant.

Indonesia
In 2016, China Railway International won a bid to build Indonesia's first high-speed rail, the  Jakarta–Bandung High Speed Rail. It will shorten the journey time between Jakarta and Bandung from over three hours to forty minutes The project, initially scheduled for completion in 2019, was delayed by land clearance issues. 2000 locals are working on the project. The project is planned for completion in August 2023.

Laos

In Laos, construction of the  Vientiane–Boten Railway began on 25 December 2016 and was completed in 2021. It is China's first overseas railway project that will connect to China's railway network. Once operational, the Laos–China Railway will be Laos' longest and connect with Thailand to become part of the proposed Kunming–Singapore railway, extending from the Chinese city of Kunming and running through Thailand and Laos to terminate at Singapore. It is estimated to cost US$5.95 billion with 70% of the railway owned by China, while Laos's remaining 30% stake will be mostly financed by loans from China. However, it faces opposition within Laos due to the high cost of the project. However, the line was officially opened on 3 December 2021.

Maldives
Maldives undertook a number of China funded projects under the Presidency of Abdullah Yameen (2013–18), including the China Maldives Friendship Bridge, The Velana International Airport and the artificial island of Hulhumalé. Many of these investments were made without adequate disclosures to the public on their cost and other terms. Under President Yameen, Maldives also amended its constitution to allow foreigners to own land in the archipelago – following which the island of Feydhoo Finholu was taken up on a long-term lease by a Chinese company.

Malaysia
Under the Premiership of Najib Razak, Malaysia signed multiple investment deals with China, including a US$27 billion East Coast Rail Link project, pipeline projects worth more than $3.1 billion, as well as a $100 billion Forest City in Johor. During the 2018 Malaysian general election, then-opposition leader Mahathir Mohamad expressed disapproval of Chinese investment in Malaysia, comparing it to selling off the country to foreigners. Upon election as Prime Minister of Malaysia, Mahathir labelled the China-funded projects as "unfair" deals authorized by former prime minister Najib Razak and would leave Malaysia "indebted" to China. As was argued by Kit Wei Zheng of Citibank, he believed that the projects were likely to have been driven more by China's geopolitical interests than by the profit motive, such that China would have access to the Straits of Malacca.

In August 2018, at the end of an official visit to China, Mahathir cancelled the East Coast Rail Link project and two other pipeline projects that had been awarded to the China Petroleum Pipeline Bureau. These had been linked to corruption at state fund 1Malaysia Development Berhad, citing a need to reduce debt incurred by the previous government.

In addition, Mahathir also threatened to deny foreign buyers a long-stay visa, prompting a clarification by Housing Minister Zuraida Kamaruddin and the Prime Minister's Office.

The project undergo negotiations for several months and close to be cancelled off. After rounds of negotiation and diplomatic mission, the ECRL project is resumed after Malaysia and China agreed to continue the project with reduced cost of RM 44 billion (US$10.68 billion) from the original of RM 65.5 billion.

Malaysia-China Kuantan Industrial Park (MCKIP) was officially launched on February 5, 2013, and is strategically located in the special economic zone, East Coast Economic Region (ECER) in Kuantan, Pahang.

With total area of 14.2 sq.km (3,500 acres), MCKIP comprises MCKIP 1 (1,200 acres), MCKIP 2 (1,000 acres) and MCKIP 3 (1,300 acres). MCKIP 1 and 2 cater for heavy and medium industries while MCKIP 3 caters for logistic hub, light industries, residential and commercial components.

Pakistan

The China–Pakistan Economic Corridor is a major Belt and Road Initiative project encompassing investments in transport, energy and maritime infrastructure.

Sri Lanka
China's main investment in Sri Lanka was the Magampura Mahinda Rajapaksa Port, mostly funded by the Chinese government and built by two Chinese companies. It claims to be the largest port in Sri Lanka after the Port of Colombo and the "biggest port constructed on land to date in the country" and is often cited as an example of China's Debt Trap Diplomacy where the port was leased to pay off Chinese debts. However, in 2017, Sri Lanka experienced a debt distress that was unconnected to Chinese lending but instead resulted more from excessive borrowing from Western-dominated capital markets and poor domestic policy decisions. Instead of defaulting on their debts, former Sri Lankan President Mahinda Rajapaksa sought out China to lease their port to obtain foreign currency inflows. The money from China Merchant Ports was used to strengthen Sri Lanka's US-dollar reserves and pay short-term foreign debts unrelated to the port.

The port's strategic location and subsequent ownership spurred concern over China's growing economic footprint in the Indian Ocean and speculation that it could be used as a naval base. The Sri Lankan government promised that it was intended "purely for civilian use".

Colombo International Financial City built on land reclaimed from the Indian Ocean and funded with $1.4bn in Chinese investment is a special financial zone and another major Chinese investment in Sri Lanka.

Saudi Arabia
The Al Mashaaer Al Mugaddassah Mecca shuttle train, a light rail project to carry pilgrims during the Haj.

Mecca Metro, a railway in Saudi Arabia to be built at a cost of $16.5bn,
 The Mecca Mass Rail Transit Project (MMRT) project will include the construction of four new metro lines A, B, C and D complementing the Al Mashaaer Al Mugaddassah metro line. The new lines will have a total length of 180km and will cover about 88 stations.

Thailand
In Thailand in 2005, the Chinese pharmaceutical company, Holley Group, and the Thai industrial estate developer, Amata Group, signed an agreement to develop the Thai–Chinese Rayong Industrial Zone. Since 2012, Chinese companies have also opened solar, rubber, and industrial manufacturing plants in the zone, and the zone expects the number to increase to 500 by 2021. Chinese media have attributed this to Thailand's zero tax incentives on land use and export products as well as favorable labor costs, and claimed that the zone had created more than 3000 local jobs.

In December 2017, China and Thailand began the construction of a high-speed railway that links the cities of Bangkok and Nakhon Ratchasima, which will be extended to Nong Khai to connect with Laos, as part of the planned Kunming–Singapore railway. The first high-speed rail rail station in Thailand should be complete in 2021, with lines to enter service in 2024.

Progress on the high-speed line has stuttered for several years with Thai authorities uneasy over the high-interest rates charged by Chinese financing, the track design and even the need for the scheme. In September 2020 the Thai cabinet released a fresh portion of US$380 million cash to purchase Chinese-made bullet trains and tracks. After years of stuttering progress on a 250 km high-speed rail link, Chinese Foreign Minister Wang Yi signed a deal in Bangkok in October 2020.

Turkey 
A "Memorandum of Understanding on Aligning the Belt and Road Initiative and the Middle Corridor Initiative” was signed between Turkey and China in November 2015 during the G-20 Leaders Summit in Antalya, Turkey.

in his 2019 visit to China, President Erdogan reaffirmed his high support for the development of the BRI and asked to increase trade volume, referring to the fact that the volume of trade between the two countries reached $50 billion in the first phase, and in the second phase $100 billion in other goals. Thanks to the Baku-Tbilisi-Kars railway being integrated with Edirne-Kars high-speed train, projects with China will be able to transport their goods to Europe much sooner.

Americas 
Panama was the first to sign BRI agreements, followed by Bolivia, Antigua and Barbuda, Trinidad and Tobago, and Guyana. Newer additions include: Barbados, Cuba, Dominica, the Dominican Republic, Grenada, Jamaica, and Suriname.

Argentina 
The Argentine-China Joint Hydropower Project will build two dams on the Santa Cruz River in southern Argentina: Condor Cliff and La Barrancosa. The China Gezhouba Group Corporation (CGGC) will be responsible for the project, which is expected to provide 5,000 direct and 15,000 indirect jobs in the country. It will generate 4,950 MWh of electricity, reducing the dependence on fossil fuels.

Argentina will also build a Hualong One nuclear plant that is expected to commence construction in 2022 and be fully operational by 2028 at a cost of US$8 billion, of which 85% financing is provided by Chinese banks. The nuclear deal agreement with Argentina is one of China's first successful bids in exporting its domestic Nuclear power technology abroad.

Barbados 
On 21 February 2019, Barbados signed a memorandum of understanding for Barbados to join the BRI.Diplomat stresses efforts to bring China-Barbados cooperation to new stage – Xinhua | English.news.cnChinese state councilor meets foreign minister of Barbados – People's Daily Online

Bolivia
There are currently six proposed hydroelectric power projects (HPP) in Bolivia. Of the six, only two have been completed--the San Jose I HPP in 2018 and the San Jose II in June 2019--and are both now producing energy to the national grid. 

Feb. 7, 2020 shows the opening ceremony of the Parapeti Bridge on the under-construction El Espino-Charagua-Boyuibe Highway in Santa Cruz, Bolivia. (Xinhua/Xin Yuewei)

Ecuador

There are currently eight Chinese-associated HPPs in Ecuador. This paper will analyze these eight projects in terms of interactions with the environment, local community impact, and legal issues (all scores on these indicators are visible in the accompanying scorecard). We will additionally compare how the BRI operates and its relative success in the hydropower sector in comparison to Bolivia. 

Summary of project outcomes:

Construction is complete at four of the eight projects (Sopladora, Minas San Francisco, Delsitanisagua, and Canar & Naranjal). During construction, there were minimal environmental impacts, positive community development initiatives, and limited corruption.
Construction at two of the eight (Mazar-Dudas and Quijos) projects has been delayed since December 2015 due to contract terminations. During the delays, there have been substantial positive community development initiatives but some negative environmental impacts.
Construction is complete at one of the eight (Coca Codo Sinclair) projects but was hindered by corruption along with both negative environmental and local community impacts.
Construction at one of the eight (Toachi Pilaton) projects has been delayed due to corruption. There were negative impacts on both environment and local communities.

Jamaica 
On 11 April 2019, Jamaica and China signed a memorandum of understanding for Jamaica to join the BRI.

Panama 
Since late 2018, China is the biggest user of the Panama Canal for importing and exporting goods using the Belt and Road Initiative. The country of Panama links Central and South America for exporting Chinese goods.

Peru 
The director of the Asia & Latin America Program for Inter-American Dialogue, Margaret Myers, stated "The Chancay port is a prime example of how China seeks to secure, from end to end, the supply chains that underpin its economic growth and its aspirations to upgrade its economy".

Venezuela 

Although not technically in the BRI, in 2001 Venezuela became the first country in South America to sign an agreement with China it termed "strategic development partnership". As of January 2019, the list totals 790 projects. Loans from China to Venezuela reached at least $50 billion by 2017, or one-third of the Chinese Development Bank investment in the continent. Along with the money came 500,000 Chinese citizens. Chinese geologists have mapped and prospected just under 1,000,000 square kilometres of Venezuelan land. The Chinese covet the thorium deposits for their planned global constellation of nuclear reactors.

See also 
 Foreign relations of China

References

Belt and Road Initiative
International economics lists